IP Tomar Rugby is a rugby team based in Tomar, Portugal. As of the 2012/13 season, they play in the Second Division of the Campeonato Nacional de Rugby (National Championship).

External links
IP Tomar Rugby

Portuguese rugby union teams